The 1997–98 Logan Cup was a first-class cricket competition held in Zimbabwe from 28 August – 25 October 1997. It was won by the Mashonaland Cricket Team, who won both of their games to top the table.

Points table

References

1997 in Zimbabwean cricket
1997 in Zimbabwean sport
Domestic cricket competitions in 1997–98
Logan Cup